MSAD may refer to:

 Microsoft Active Directory, a component of Microsoft Windows that provides distributed user management and authentication
 Maine School Administrative District are school districts in Maine. There are a total of 72 MSADs.